(February 6, 1897 – January 23, 1985) was a Japanese Marxian economist. A professor of economics at Kyushu University, he is remembered as a leading theoretician of the Japan Socialist Party.

Biography 
Sakisaka was born in Ōmuta, Fukuoka in 1897. He graduated from the University of Tokyo in 1921. When he was a university student, he read Karl Marx’s writings as a way to study German, and wound up becoming a Marxist. Sakisaka studied in Germany from 1922 to 1925. During the hyperinflation in Germany after World War I, he was able to purchase numerous editions of Karl Marx’s writings at low prices. After he returned to Japan, he became an assistant professor at Kyushu University. In 1926, he became a full professor. He was also known as a member of the coterie of the magazine "Rōnō" and an artist and became one of the leading Marxian economists in Japan.

When the crackdown against socialism and communism became severe in 1928, Sakisaka was forced to resign from his university post, along with two other professors. He moved to Tokyo, where he became involved in the compilation and translation of the "Marx and Engels Complete Collection." In 1930s, he was active as a representative of the "Rōnō" faction of Marxist thinkers. 

In 1937 Sakisaka was arrested and imprisoned in connection with the First Popular Front Incident. After posting bail, he was banned from publishing or speaking in public. Confined to house arrest, he translated German books anonymously, and lived self-sufficiently by operating a home farm. During World War II, many of Sakisaka's socialist and communist comrades permanently "converted" (tenkō suru) away from Marxism under police pressure. Although Sakisaka was not able to actively resist the wartime militarist regime, he also did not support the regime, and was not forced to "convert."

After World War II, socialism and the communism movement were legalized by the U.S.-led occupation of Japan. Sakisaka resumed his post as Professor at Kyushu University, and began to advocate a nonviolent socialist revolution in Japan. After Japan Socialist Party split in 1950, Sakisaka co-founded a think tank called the "Socialist Association" (社会主義協会, Shakaishugi Kyōkai) along with Hitoshi Yamakawa, and he became a leading theorist of the Leftist Socialist Party. The Leftist Socialist Party and Rightist Socialist Party merged back together in 1955, but Sakisaka opposed this decision.

When Yamakawa died in 1958, Sakisaka became the undisputed leader of the Socialist Association. A charismatic public speaker and eloquent polemicist, be gained a wide following within the rank-and-file of the Japan Socialist Party and the Japanese labor movement. Sakisaka gave public lectures, offered less formal lectures on "Das Kapital" to gatherings of Socialist Party members and labor movement activists at his home, casually dropped in on labor union study sessions around the country.

Freed from the moderating influence of Yamakawa, in the late 1950s Sakisaka began to vociferously criticize the merger of the Right and Left Socialist Parties. In December 1958 he published an infamous article, nicknamed the "Sakisaka Thesis," in which he harshly criticized Right Socialist leader Suehiro Nishio without ever directly mentioning his name. Lambasting the 1955 merger, Sakisaka wrote that if you hoped to travel from Kyushu to Tokyo, you needed to build a party that could take you all the way, not one that would only take you as far as Osaka (Nisho's home base). Sakisaka also attacked Nishio's notion that the Socialist Party should try to expand its base by reaching out to farmers and small business owners, insisting that a true socialist revolution could only be carried out by the working class. Sakisaka's polemic persuaded many within the Socialist Party that Nishio and the Right Socialists were an impediment to achieving revolution in Japan and had to go, which contributed directly to Nisho and the Right Socialists being driven out of the Party to form the Democratic Socialist Party in January 1960.

After helping drive Nishio out of the Socialist Party, Sakisaka became deeply involved in providing theoretical underpinnings for the bloody Miike Struggle in 1960 between striking miners and the Mitsui conglomerate at the Miike Coal Mine in Fukuoka prefecture. The Miike struggle eventually ended in total defeat for the workers, but the struggle lasted for almost a year, and Sakisaka's theorizing had proven to be a powerful mobilizing force.

From the 1960s to 1970s, younger activists groomed by Socialist Association (and thus by Sakisaka) began to hold ever greater sway within the Socialist Party. At Sakisaka's urging, they succeeded in defeating Saburō Eda's attempt to take the Party in a more moderate direction under the slogan "Structural Reform." In 1968, Sakisaka published his "Socialist Association Thesis," which could be said to be the culmination of his socialist theorizing. From the 1960s, Sakisaka built increasingly close relationships with leaders in the Soviet Union.

Sakisaka died in 1985.

References

Bibliography
坂本守『向坂逸郎・ゆき　叛骨の昭和史』西日本新聞社、1982
上野建一・石河康国ほか『山川均・向坂逸郎外伝　労農派　1925-1985』（上・下）社会主義協会、2002・2004
小島恒久『向坂逸郎　その人と思想』えるむ書房 2005
佐藤優・山崎耕一郎『マルクスと日本人』明石書店　2015
石河康国『向坂逸郎評伝』上巻１８９７～１９５０、下巻１９５１～１９８５ 社会評論社　2018

External links
Socialist Association

People of Meiji-period Japan
Japanese socialists
1897 births
1985 deaths